Thomas Lundgren (born 25 October 1956) is a Swedish ski jumper. He competed in the normal hill event at the 1976 Winter Olympics.

References

External links
 

1956 births
Living people
Swedish male ski jumpers
Olympic ski jumpers of Sweden
Ski jumpers at the 1976 Winter Olympics
People from Örnsköldsvik Municipality
Sportspeople from Västernorrland County